The Higher Regional Court of Dresden is the Higher Regional Court of Saxony.

History 
The Higher Regional Court was established on 1 October 1879, replacing the 1835 established Oberappellationsgericht (High Court of Appeal). In 1945, it's building, the "Landgerichtsgebäude Pillnitzer Straße" was destroyed during the bombing of Dresden in World War II.

In 1952, the court was dissolved due to a law established by East Germany, stating that the courts jurisdiction would be replaced with the Supreme Court of East Germany.

On 1 January 1993, the Higher Regional Court of Dresden was re-established.

Former presidents of the court

(1879-1952) Before dissolution 
 Anton von Weber (1879–1888)
 Heinrich Bethmann Klemm (1888–1890)
 Friedrich Alfred Degner (1890–1893)
 Karl Edmund Werner (1893–1898)
 August Julius Loßnitzer (1898–1908)
 Karl Heinrich Börner (1908–1913)
 Georg Albert Geßler (1913–1920)
 Karl Georg Paul Grützmann (1920–1922)
 Karl Emil Mannsfeld (1922–1929/31)
 Alfred Hüttner (1931–1939)
 Rudolf Beyer (1939–1945)
 Wilhelm Weiland (1945–1948)
 Carl Günther Ruland (1948–1950)
 Fritz Pogorschelsky (1950–1952)

(1993–) After re-establishment 
 Günter Hirsch (1993–1995)
 Klaus Budewig (1995–2006)
 Ulrich Hagenloch (2006–2017)
 Gilbert Häfner (2017–2020)
 Leon Ross (since 2021)

References 

Courts and tribunals established in 1993
Courts in Germany
Organisations based in Dresden